Boulder Lake may refer to: 

Boulder Lake (Idaho), United States
Boulder Lake (Washington), United States
Boulder Lake (New Zealand)

See also
Bouder Lake